Picturehouse is an American independent entertainment company owned by CEO Bob Berney and COO Jeanne R. Berney. Based in Los Angeles, the company specializes in film marketing and distribution, both in the U.S. and internationally. Its releases have included Metallica Through the Never, and Adam Wingard’s Sundance Film Festival selection The Guest, an Independent Spirit Award nominee starring Dan Stevens.

In September 2021, Picturehouse announced that it will release Becoming Cousteau, a documentary that uses previously unseen archival footage to chronicle the life and career of the adventurous oceanographer and filmmaker Jacques-Yves Cousteau, who coinvented scuba diving and foretold the impact of pollution on climate change. Directed by Liz Garbus, the film was released on October 22, 2021. 

In August 2020, the company released Fatima, directed by Marco Pontecorvo and starring Joaquim de Almeida, Goran Visnjic, Harvey Keitel and Sônia Braga. The film tells the story of a 10-year-old shepherd, Lúcia dos Santos, and her two young cousins, Francisco and Jacinta Marto, who report having seen apparitions of the Blessed Virgin Mary in Fátima, Portugal, circa 1917. Their revelations inspire believers but anger officials of both the Catholic Church and the secular government, who try to force them to recant their story. As word of their prophecy spreads, tens of thousands of religious pilgrims flock to the site to witness what became known as the Miracle of the Sun.

History 
Formed by Bob Berney in 2005, Picturehouse was a joint venture created by Time Warner subsidiaries, New Line Cinema and HBO Films to acquire, produce and distribute independent films. Berney, who guided the acquisition, marketing and distribution of My Big Fat Greek Wedding and The Passion of the Christ, among other notable releases, ran the company from its inception.

Over the next two years Picturehouse released features such as Robert Altman’s A Prairie Home Companion, starring Meryl Streep and Lily Tomlin; Guillermo del Toro’s Pan’s Labyrinth, which was acquired at script stage and went on to earn six Academy Award nominations and wins in three categories; La Vie En Rose, which garnered Marion Cotillard an Academy Award for Best Actress; and Sergei Bodrov’s Genghis Khan biopic Mongol, a nominee for Best Foreign Language Film.

In 2008 Time Warner's consolidation resulted in Warner Bros. exiting the independent business to concentrate on big-budget “tentpole” releases. This prompted the closure of marketing and distribution operations at both New Line Cinema and Picturehouse, costing 70 employees their jobs.

In 2013 Berney and his wife Jeanne acquired the Picturehouse logo and trademark from Warner Bros. and relaunched the label as an independent theatrical distribution company. Initial releases included Adriana Trigiani’s Big Stone Gap, starring Ashley Judd, and Christian Keller’s Gloria, with Sofía Espinosa.

Filmography

2000s 
Original seal, distributed by New Line Home Entertainment and HBO Video (now Warner Bros. Home Entertainment)

2010s 
Revived seal, distributed by Universal Pictures Home Entertainment

2020s 

NOTE: All films now distributed by Studio Distribution Services, LLC. a joint venture between UPHE and WBHE.

References

External links 
 

Film production companies of the United States
Former Time Warner subsidiaries
Mass media companies established in 2005
Entertainment companies established in 2005
Mass media companies established in 2013
Entertainment companies established in 2013
New Line Cinema
HBO
Re-established companies
American independent film studios